Robert Thomas Wills (born 19 July 1950) is a former Irish first-class cricketer.

Wills was born at Belfast and educated in the city at Everton Secondary School. Playing his club cricket for Woodvale in Belfast, Wills made his debut in first-class cricket for Ireland against Scotland at Dublin in 1981. The following season he made his debut in List A one-day cricket against Northamptonshire at Northampton in the NatWest Trophy. He played first-class and List A cricket for Ireland until 1985, making five appearances in first-class cricket and four in List A cricket. In first-class cricket, he scored 121 runs at a batting average of 17.28, with a highest score of 48. In List A cricket, he scored 24 runs with a high score of 13. Outside of cricket, Wills worked as an engineer.

References

External links

1950 births
Living people
Cricketers from Belfast
Irish cricketers